The Domain Assurance Council (DAC) was a trade association started in Summer 2006 by Paul Hoffman and John Levine.

Members
Members of DAC are divided into categories. They include
Full Members
Goodmail
Habeas
ReturnPath
Trend Micro
Technology Members
Client Members
Constant Contact
ISP Members
Go Daddy

See also
Vouch by Reference
DKIM

References

External links
Official website
archived snapshot of March 2010 The Domain Assurance Council is no longer active.

Anti-spam